The Ministry of Health is a Portuguese government ministry.

External links

See also
Healthcare in Portugal

Portugal
Health